Lasiothyris sorbia is a species of moth of the family Tortricidae. It is found in Brazil in the Federal District and Espírito Santo.

References

Moths described in 1993
Cochylini